Arthur Chetwynd Bt. (1913-2004) was a Canadian film producer and founder and president of the pioneering film production company Chetwynd Films. He was an early, prolific producer of sponsored short documentaries; it has been estimated that he produced as many as 3,000 films. At the 12th Canadian Film Awards in 1960, Chetwynd was presented with a Special Award "for dedicated service in the interest of Canadian filmmakers as an executive officer of the Association of Motion Picture Producers and Laboratories of Canada".

Early life
Arthur Ralph Talbot Chetwynd was born in the ghost town of Walhachin, a once-affluent hamlet in Thompson Country, in the British Columbia Interior. His father, Ralph Chetwynd was an English war hero (Military Cross 1918) who had moved to Canada to go into the cattle and fruit-growing business; he would become one of the founders of the Pacific Great Eastern Railway as well as a Member of the Legislative Assembly for the Cariboo, and British Columbia's Minister of Trade and Industry, Minister of Railways and Fisheries, and Minister of Agriculture. The city of Chetwynd, British Columbia is named after him. 

Arthur grew up in Vernon, in the British Columbia fruit-growing region of Okanagan. After graduating from Vernon Preparatory School, he attended the University of British Columbia. From 1943 to 1945, he was Chief Instructor for Medical Reconditioning for the Royal Canadian Air Force. After the war, he taught Physical and Health Education at the University of Toronto and became Publicity Officer for the University of Toronto Athletic Association, as well as Field Supervisor for the Canadian Red Cross Swimming and Water Safety program. In 1950, he founded Chetwynd Films and formally left the university in 1952.

Career
The first productions of Chetwynd Films’ (aka Chetwynd Productions) were films on coaching, education, and the activities of the Red Cross. These were followed by children’s shows for the Canadian Broadcasting Corporation. Beginning in 1947, he produced shows about each Grey Cup championship, as well as shows for the Canadian Football League teams and the CFL's annual Schenley Awards. Beginning in 1952, he produced shows about each Calgary Stampede. 

Sports shows would account for 30% of Chetwynd's work; the rest was made up by films about accident prevention, medicine and travel, often in co-production with the National Film Board of Canada. 

In 1972, Chetwynd succeeded his uncle as 8th Baronet Chetwynd, of Brocton Hall, Staffordshire. In 1977, his son Robin took over as president of Chetwynd Films and Arthur founded the Toronto PR firm Brocton Hall Communications. He retired in 1988.

Honours
 Victory Medal (1945)
 Canadian Volunteer Service Medal (1945)
 Queen Elizabeth II Silver Jubilee Medal (1977)
 Order of Barbados Silver Crown of Merit (1984)
 Freedom of the City of London (1989)
 Queen Elizabeth II Golden Jubilee Medal (2003)
 Knight Commander, Military and Hospitaller Order of Saint Lazarus of Jerusalem
 Canadian Film and Television Production Association, Honorary Life Member
 Society of Motion Picture and Television Engineers, Life Member

Personal Life and death
Chetwynd was community-minded and acted as member, director, president, chair and/or patron of the 
Empire Club of Canada, the Royal Commonwealth Society of Canada, the Monarchist League of Canada, the Saint Lazarus Society, Grenville Christian College, the Barbados National Trust, and the Canterbury Cathedral Restoration Appeal in Canada.

He died in Cobourg, Ontario in 2004, at age 94, survived by his wife Marjory and three sons.

References=

1913 births
2004 deaths
Canadian film producers